Herbert Langley (1888–1967) was a well-known early twentieth-century English opera singer (baritone) who later also played leading acting roles in a number of British silent films; and then smaller roles with the arrival of sound. His was the father of cinematographer Bryan Langley.

Selected filmography

References

External links

1888 births
1967 deaths
English male film actors
English opera singers
20th-century English male actors
20th-century English singers